Power 98 is an English radio station of So Drama! Entertainment in Singapore. It is a 24-hour English entertainment station which features contemporary pop music and the latest entertainment news and sports updates.

The station underwent its first major revamp in 18 years on 19 March 2012, which includes changing its slogan from Hit Music and More to Hear The Difference, an overhaul of the station's website and a new line-up of DJs and programmes.

See also
List of radio stations in Singapore

References

External links
POWER 98 Official Website

1994 establishments in Singapore
Radio stations established in 1994
Radio stations in Singapore